Guiscriff is a commune in the Morbihan department in Brittany in north-western France.

Population
Inhabitants of Guiscriff are called Guiscrivites. Guiscriff's population peaked at 5,896 in 1921 and declined to 2,083 in 2019. This represents a 64.7% decrease in total population since the peak census figure.

Geography

Historically, the village belongs to Cornouaille.

History
thumb|center| Coat of arms of the Toultenoutre, lords of Penehoc in Guiscriff.

Gallery

Church and chapels

See also
Communes of the Morbihan department

References

External links

 Mayors of Morbihan Association 

Communes of Morbihan